Ryne Douglas Pearson (born August 15, 1964) is an American novelist, screenwriter, and YouTube cooking show host.

His YouTube channel "Cooking With Ry" focuses on outdoor cooking, grilling, and barbecue.

Works

Novels 

 Art Jefferson series:
 Cloudburst, AKA Thunder One (1993)
 October's Ghost (1995)
 Capitol Punishment (1995)
 Simple Simon (1996)
 Simon Sees (2018)

 Top Ten (1999)
 Confessions (2010)
 All for One (2010)
 The Donzerly Light (2010)
 District One series:
 Cop Killer (2013)

Short story collections 

 Dark and Darker (2010). Contains 4 short stories:
 "Beholder"
 "Creation"
 "The Key"
 "Shark"

Short stories 

Uncollected short stories.
 "Get A Good Tree Or Die Trying" (2011)

Nonfiction 

 Do Not Call... or Else (2013)

Films 

 Mercury Rising (1998), based on the 1996 novel Simple Simon
 Knowing (2009), wrote the concept story and helped write the script, also co-producer.

References

External links 
 
 
 

1964 births
American male screenwriters
Living people
American male novelists
People from Los Angeles
Novelists from California
Screenwriters from California